Eric [Rick] John Bardsley (1903–1958) was an Australian Rugby Union player and represented for the Wallabies three times.

Early life
Bardsley attended Newington College (1918–1923) and played Rugby in the 1st XV for three years.

Rugby career
Bardsley played in the back row and represented Northern Suburbs Rugby Club in 139 1st Grade games. In 1928 he toured New Zealand and played in three Test matches.

Club controversy
In 1942 Bardsley admitted to sending food parcels to Russia and after his patriotism to Australia was questioned by fellow members of Norths Rugby, he and his brother-in-law, fellow Wallaby Wal Mackney, resigned from the club.

References

1903 births
1958 deaths
Australian rugby union players
Rugby union locks
People educated at Newington College
Australia international rugby union players
Rugby union players from Sydney